German Township is located in Richland County, Illinois. As of the 2010 census, its population was 341 and it contained 143 housing units.  Before May 2, 1859, this locale was known as Troy Township.

Geography

Demographics

References

External links
City-data.com
Illinois State Archives

Townships in Richland County, Illinois
German-American culture in Illinois
Townships in Illinois